KNIM (1580 AM) is radio station licensed to Maryville, Missouri. It airs a country music format

History
KNIM began broadcasting in 1953 and was owned by the Maryville Radio and Television Corporation. It originally ran 250 watts, during daytime hours only. In September 1972, its sister station KNIM-FM began broadcasting, simulcasting the programming of KNIM.

On January 1, 2022, Regional Media acquired the station and its sister station KVVL from Nodaway Broadcasting which had been owned by Jim and Joyce Cronin since 1996.

On January 10, 2022, KNIM rebranded as "I'm Country KNIM".

Translator
KNIM is also heard at 95.9 MHz, through a translator in Maryville, Missouri.

Previous logo

References

External links

Nodaway County, Missouri
NIM
Country radio stations in the United States
Radio stations established in 1953
1953 establishments in Missouri